The Seventeenth Amendment of the Constitution of South Africa (formally the Constitution Seventeenth Amendment Act of 2012) made a number of changes to the structure of the South African judiciary. The bill for the amendment was passed by the National Assembly on 20 November 2012 with the required two-thirds majority; because it is a constitutional amendment not affecting the provinces it was not required to be voted on by the National Council of Provinces. The act was signed by  President Jacob Zuma on 1 February 2013, and a presidential proclamation brought it into force on 23 August 2013. The amendment came into force simultaneously with the Superior Courts Act, 2013, which implemented a major rationalisation and restructuring of the judicial system.

Provisions
The amendment declares that the Chief Justice is the head of the judiciary and is responsible for administrative oversight of the courts. It allows the appointment of a Constitutional Court judge as acting Deputy Chief Justice (DCJ) if the position is vacant or the DCJ is absent. It expands the jurisdiction of the Constitutional Court so that, as well as constitutional matters, the court will also have jurisdiction over other matters of general public importance that it chooses to hear. It also removes the jurisdiction of the Supreme Court of Appeal over appeals from the Labour Appeal Court and the Competition Appeal Court. It alters references to the High Courts so that they are regarded as divisions of a single High Court of South Africa rather than separate courts.

References

External links

 Official text (PDF)

Amendments of the Constitution of South Africa
2012 in South African law